Davit Chaloyan is an Armenian boxer. He participated at the 2021 AIBA World Boxing Championships, being awarded the silver medal in the super heavyweight event. Chaloyan also participated at the 2022 European Amateur Boxing Championships in the super heavyweight event. He defeated Suraj Soldo in the preliminary round.

References

External links 

Living people
Place of birth missing (living people)
Year of birth missing (living people)
Armenian male boxers
Super-heavyweight boxers
AIBA World Boxing Championships medalists